Thomas Vernon Gilmore Sr. (7 May 1908 – 14 November 1994) was an Australian politician.

Born in Wolfram, Queensland, he was educated at state schools before becoming a sugarcane and tobacco grower at Babinda. He served in the military 1942–47.

In 1949, he was elected to the Australian House of Representatives as the Country Party member for the new seat of Leichhardt, notionally held by Labor. He was defeated by the Labor candidate in 1951 and, after a stint in the Parliament of Queensland as the member for Tablelands (1957–1963) retired to become a grazier and cattle-breeder.

Gilmore died in 1994 at the age of 86.

References

National Party of Australia members of the Parliament of Australia
Members of the Australian House of Representatives for Leichhardt
Members of the Australian House of Representatives
1908 births
1994 deaths
National Party of Australia members of the Parliament of Queensland
Royal Australian Air Force personnel of World War II
20th-century Australian politicians